The R-S-T system is used by amateur radio operators, shortwave listeners, and other radio hobbyists to exchange information about the quality of a radio signal being received. The code is a three digit number, with one digit each for conveying an assessment of the signal's readability, strength, and tone.  The code was developed in 1934 by Amateur radio operator Arthur W. Braaten, W2BSR, and was similar to that codified in the ITU Radio Regulations, Cairo, 1938.

Readability
The R stands for "Readability".  Readability is a qualitative assessment of how easy or difficult it is to correctly copy the information being sent during the transmission.  In a Morse code telegraphy transmission, readability refers to how easy or difficult it is to distinguish each of the characters in the text of the message being sent; in a voice transmission, readability refers to how easy or difficult it is for each spoken word to be understood correctly.  Readability is measured on a scale of 1 to 5.

 Unreadable
 Barely readable, occasional words distinguishable
 Readable with considerable difficulty
 Readable with practically no difficulty
 Perfectly readable

Strength
The S stands for "Strength".  Strength is an assessment of how powerful the received signal is at the receiving location.  Although an accurate signal strength meter can determine a quantitative value for signal strength, in practice this portion of the RST code is a qualitative assessment, often made based on the S meter of the radio receiver at the location of signal reception.  "Strength" is measured on a scale of 1 to 9.

 Faint—signals barely perceptible
 Very weak signals
 Weak signals
 Fair signals
 Fairly good signals
 Good signals
 Moderately strong signals
 Strong signals
 Extremely strong signals

For a quantitative assessment, quality HF receivers are calibrated so that S9 on the S-meter corresponds to a signal of 50 μV at the antenna standard terminal impedance 50 ohms. One "S" difference should correspond to 6 dB at signal strength (2x voltage = 4x power). On VHF and UHF receivers used for weak signal communications, S9 often corresponds to 5 μV at the antenna terminal 50 ohms. Amateur radio (ham) operators may also use a signal strength of "20 to 60 over 9", or "+20 to +60 over 9."  This is in reference to a signal that exceeds S9 on a signal meter on a HF receiver.

Tone
Tone only pertains to Morse code and other digital transmission modes and is therefore omitted during voice operations. With modern technology, imperfections in the quality of transmitters’ digital modulation severe enough to be detected by human ears are rare.

Suffixes were historically added to indicate other signal properties, and might be sent as 599K to indicate a clear, strong signal but with bothersome key clicks.

Variations
An example RST report for a voice transmission is "59", usually pronounced "five nine" or "five by nine", a report that indicates a perfectly readable and very strong signal. Exceptionally strong signals are designated by the quantitative number of decibels, in excess of "S9", displayed on the receiver's S meter. Example: "Your signal is 30 dB over S9," or more simply, "Your signal is 30 over 9."

Because the N character in Morse code requires less time to send than the 9, during amateur radio contests where the competing amateur radio stations are all using Morse code, the nines in the RST are typically abbreviated to N to read 5NN.  In general, this practice is referred to as abbreviated or "cut" numbers.

The RSQ system has also been proposed for digital modes as an alternative to the RST system.  The Q replaces "Tone" with "Quality" on a similar 1-9 scale indicating presence or number of unwanted 'sidebar pairs' in a narrow-band digital mode, such as PSK31 or RTTY.

See also
Plain Language Radio Checks
QSA and QRK code (for Morse code only)
SINPO
Signal strength and readability report
Circuit Merit (for wired and wireless telephone circuits only, not radiotelephony)
QSL card
 R-S-M-Q, A Standard Method of Reporting for Telephony, A. M. Braaten, T. & R. Bulletin 1936

References

External links 
 Ham Radio RST Signal Reporting System for CW Operation, by Charlie Bautsch, W5AM
 RSQ - An Improved Signal Reporting System for PSK

Amateur radio
Encodings
Operating signals
Telecommunications-related introductions in 1934